San Giovannino dei Cavalieri (Young St. John the Baptist of the Knights) previously named Church of San Giovanni Decollato (Decapitated St. John), is a parish church situated in Via San Gallo in central Florence, Italy.

Initially the site held a 14th-century home for women of "easy virtue" and dedicated to St. Mary Magdalen, it was renamed after the patron saint of the Cavalieri or Knights of Malta. Rebuilt from 1553-1784, with facade added in 1699. Presently it contains a Coronation of the Virgin by Neri di Bicci, a Nativity by Bicci di Lorenzo, an Annunciation attributed to the Master of Stratonice, a Decapitation of St. John the Baptist by Pietro Dandini, vault frescoes by Alessandro Gherardini, a painted cross in the apse by Lorenzo Monaco, and a Last Supper by Palma il Giovane.

References

External links

Roman Catholic churches in Florence
Church buildings of the Knights Hospitaller
18th-century Roman Catholic church buildings in Italy
Roman Catholic churches completed in 1784
Baroque architecture in Florence